Statistics of the Scottish Football League in season 1931–32.

Scottish League Division One

Scottish League Division Two

See also
1931–32 in Scottish football

References

 
Scottish Football League seasons